Kélonia is a public aquarium and observatory specialising in Marine turtles in Saint-Leu, Réunion.

It was built on the site of a former Turtle Ranch and purposes guided visits and educational workshops.

Kélonia also participates on different research programs on marine turtles. These include migratory studies, monitoring populations, genetics, etc.

It also has a turtle clinic.

Images

External links

 Official website of Kélonia.
 Ifrmer Follow released turtles of Kélonia with argos location beacons.

Kelonia in Reunion
Kelonia Sea Turtle Aquarium
Saint-Leu, Réunion
Vertebrates of Réunion
Kelonia-sea turtle oberservatory and aquarium
Organizations based in Réunion